Roberto Tinoka is a Madagascar member of the National Assembly of Madagascar and cabinet minister. He is Madagscar's minister of transport and was formerly minister of youth and sport.
He is also national secretary for the TGV (Tanora malaGasy Vonona – Ivelany) party for the province of Toliara (Tuléar).

Early life and education

Roberto Tinoka was educated

Career

Roberto Tinoka's initial work

Style

Themes

Reception

Work

Minister of Youth

Minister of Transport in Madagascar

Controversies

Awards and nominations

References

External links

 

Government ministers of Madagascar
Members of the National Assembly (Madagascar)
Year of birth missing (living people)
Living people